Harry Morris, 1st Baron Morris of Kenwood (7 October 1893 – 1 July 1954) was a British Labour Party politician.

Member of Parliament 
He was elected at the 1945 general election as Member of Parliament (MP) for Sheffield Central, defeating the Conservative incumbent William Boulton.  His constituency was abolished for the 1950 general election, when he was returned for the new Sheffield Neepsend constituency.

Resignation and Peerage 
However, he resigned his seat four weeks later, on 20 March, (by taking the Stewardship of the Manor of Northstead) to make way for the former Solicitor General Sir Frank Soskice, whose Birkenhead East constituency had been abolished.  Morris was then elevated to the peerage as Baron Morris of Kenwood in the 1950 Birthday Honours.

He died in July 1954 aged 60.

References

External links 

1893 births
1954 deaths
Labour Party (UK) MPs for English constituencies
UK MPs 1945–1950
UK MPs 1950–1951
UK MPs who were granted peerages
Labour Party (UK) hereditary peers
Barons created by George VI